Richard Kenneth Robert Alston  (born 19 December 1941) is an Australian businessman, former politician and former barrister. He served as a Senator for Victoria from 1986 to 2004, representing the Liberal Party. During the Howard Government he held ministerial office as Minister for Communications and the Arts (1996–1997), Communications, the Information Economy and the Arts (1997–1998), and Communications, Information Technology and the Arts (1998–2003). He later served as High Commissioner to the United Kingdom (2005–2008) and Federal President of the Liberal Party (2014–2017).

Early life
Alston was educated at Xavier College (Kew), the University of Melbourne and Monash University, graduating with bachelor's degrees in law, arts and commerce from Melbourne University and master's degrees in Law and Business Administration from Monash University. He was a barrister before entering politics.

His brother is noted academic Philip Alston.

Senate
On 7 May 1986 Alston was appointed by the Parliament of Victoria under section 15 of the Australian Constitution to fill the vacancy in the Australian Senate caused by the death of Senator Alan Missen. He was re-elected in 1987, 1990, 1996 and 2001.

Alston was a member of the Opposition Shadow Ministry from 1989 to 1996, and was Deputy Leader of the Opposition in the Senate 1993–96. Shadow Minister for Social Security, Child Care and Superannuation, as well as Communications and the Arts, were among the positions he held in the shadow ministry. He was Minister for Communications and the Arts 1996–97, Minister for Communications, the Information Economy and the Arts 1997–98 and Minister for Communications, Information Technology and the Arts 1998–2003. He was also Deputy Leader of the Government in the Senate 1996–2003.

Alston resigned from the Senate on 10 February 2004, and he was replaced by Mitch Fifield.

Later career
From February 2005 to February 2008, Alston served as Australian High Commissioner to the United Kingdom. Since 2004 he has been an Adjunct Professor of Information Technology at Bond University. Since 2022 he has been an Adjunct Associate Professor at the University of NSW, UNSW Canberra. c

Since leaving Parliament, Alston has served as Chairman of three listed Australian companies and as a director of a number of listed public companies in both Australia and the United Kingdom. These have been in fields as diverse as information technology, broadcasting services, sandalwood, public relations, advertising and ironsands.

Alston served as a member of the international board of CQS LLP, a United Kingdom-based hedge fund for seven years and as a director of its Australian subsidiary. Alston also served for six years as a director of United Kingdom-based public company, Chime PLC. He also served as Chairman of the advisory board of Qato Capital,an Australian long short fund, as a director of Nanuk Asset Management and as a director of Balmoral Gardens, a retirement village owner and operator for many years and a director of CPA Australia for three years..

He is currently Chairman of Sunny Ridge strawberry farms, a director of China Telecom (Australia), Chairman of National Advisory, a leading Australian corporate advisory firm, a member of the advisory board of Market Eye, a leading Australian investor relations firm and a member of the Council of the Australian National Gallery.

Alston was federal president of the Liberal Party from 2014 to 2017.

Publications
More to Life than Politics? (2020)
Australia, the United States and China in a Post-Covid World (2020)
Reflections on the EU Project and its Flaws: A Fatal Conceit about Markets and the Real World (2021)
Donald Trump: The Ultimate Contrarian (2021)
Their ABC: Inside Australia's Largest Sheltered Workshop (2022)

Honours
At the 2015 Australia Day Honours, Alston was appointed an Officer of the Order of Australia for distinguished service to the Parliament of Australia, to international relations through diplomatic roles, to business development in diverse sectors, and to the community. Alston was also awarded the Centenary Medal in 2001 for service as Minister for Communications, Information Technology and the Arts.

References

1941 births
Living people
High Commissioners of Australia to the United Kingdom
Permanent Representatives of Australia to the International Maritime Organization
Liberal Party of Australia members of the Parliament of Australia
Melbourne Law School alumni
Members of the Cabinet of Australia
Members of the Australian Senate
Members of the Australian Senate for Victoria
Monash Law School alumni
Officers of the Order of Australia
Old Xaverians Football Club players
People educated at Xavier College
Politicians from Melbourne
Recipients of the Centenary Medal
21st-century Australian politicians
20th-century Australian politicians
Government ministers of Australia
21st-century Australian non-fiction writers